Ivan Nastevski (born 30 July 1991) is a Macedonian football midfielder who plays for FK Bregalnica Štip.

Career
In the summer 2019, Nastevski joined FK Bregalnica Štip.

Honours
Teteks
Macedonian Football Cup: 2013

References

External links
 
 

1991 births
Living people
Footballers from Skopje
Association football midfielders
Macedonian footballers
North Macedonia youth international footballers
North Macedonia under-21 international footballers
FK Makedonija Gjorče Petrov players
FK Vardar players
FK Rabotnički players
FK Teteks players
Agrotikos Asteras F.C. players
FK Novi Pazar players
FK Gorno Lisiče players
Olympiacos Volos F.C. players
FK Bregalnica Štip players
Macedonian First Football League players
Football League (Greece) players
Macedonian Second Football League players
Macedonian expatriate footballers
Macedonian expatriate sportspeople in Greece
Expatriate footballers in Greece
Macedonian expatriate sportspeople in Serbia
Expatriate footballers in Serbia